WESTLOCK Interlocking is a Solid State Interlocking (SSI) product by Westinghouse Rail Systems.

Westlock builds on many of the features that made SSI popular in the United Kingdom. This includes re-use of SSI's programming language and its external hardware. 

In addition to backwards compatibility with SSI, Westlock provides additional capacity. This is currently estimated to be around four times that of an SSI, giving it the capability to control over 300 Signalling Equivalent Units (SEUs).

Leamington Spa was the test site for Westlock, and was its first operational site. It was also SSI's test site more than 20 years earlier.

Hardware 

A Westlock system is divided into a number of components, called the Central Interlocking Processor (CIP), Trackside Interface (TIF) and Technicians Workstation (TW). 

The hardware used by the TIF and CIP is similar, based around  a 2-out-of-3 architecture, whereby all safety-critical functions are performed in three separate processing lanes and the results voted upon. This provides some fault tolerance whereby a single module can fail and the system can continue operating in 2-out-of-2 mode.

Central Interlocking Processor (CIP) 
A CIP consists of 3 main processor modules which perform the safety-critical interlocking functionality. In addition it possesses two communications modules which provide redundant Ethernet connectivity (duplicated for availability) and two digital input modules (duplicated for availability) which can service up to 32 local inputs.

Trackside Interface (TIF) 
A TIF also contains 3 main processor modules and two Ethernet communications modules, but additionally has two SSI communications modules, which are used to interface to an SSI compatible data links. The TIF itself does not perform any interlocking functionality, it operates only as a protocol converter.

Technicians Workstation (TW) 
The TW is provided to diagnose faults in the track-side equipment and also within the Westlock equipment. It provides a graphic interface which includes a map of the area of Railway under control and operates on an industrial PC platform.

References 

Railway signalling control
Interlocking systems